Zrin  is a village in Croatia, Sisak-Moslavina County (Dvor Municipality).

In the past it was the seat of the Šubić noble family. Later the family called themselves Zrinski, after Zrin Castle. It was a stronghold of Croatian defense in the Ottoman wars. There are still ruins of Zrin Castle in the village.

The Partisans attacked the Croatian village during World War II, apparently citing a sizable Ustaše presence in the village to justify their attack. From the 9–10 September 1943, Partisan forces killed as many as 270 Croat civilians and burned the village down, together with the old Roman Catholic church of the Holy Cross, forcing many to flee. After the liberation of Yugoslavia, the communist regime relocated the remaining Croatian population to confiscated houses in Slavonia after it had exiled the Volksdeutsche Danube Swabians.

In the Croatian War of Independence, Zrin was held by the Serb forces and was part of the unrecognized self-proclaimed Republic of Serbian Krajina. In Operation Storm (1995), Zrin was taken by the Croatian Army. It is inhabited by 12 residents.

See also
 Zrinska gora
 House of Zrinski

References

External links
Memorial to residents of Zrin killed on September 9th, 1943
Zrin - from (medieval) glory to (World War II) genocide

Banovina
Populated places in Sisak-Moslavina County